During Ukraine's post-Soviet history, the far-right has remained on the political periphery and been largely excluded from national politics since independence in 1991. Unlike most Eastern European countries which saw far-right groups become permanent fixtures in their countries' politics during the decline and fall of the Soviet Union in 1991, the national electoral support for far-right parties in Ukraine only rarely exceeded 3% of the popular vote. Far-right parties usually enjoyed just a few wins in single-mandate districts, and no far right candidate for president has ever secured more than 5 percent of the popular vote in an election. Only once in the 1994–2014 period was a radical right-wing party elected to the parliament as an independent organization within the proportional part of the voting: Svoboda in 2012. Since then even at the height of nationalist sentiment during and after Russia's annexation of Crimea and the Russo-Ukrainian War far-right parties have failed to gain enough votes to attain political representation.

The far-right was heavily represented among the pro-Russian separatists with several past or current leaders of the republics of Donetsk and Luhansk linked to various neo-Nazi, white supremacists and ultra nationalists groups. The importance of the far-right on both sides of the conflict declined over time.

In the 2019 Ukrainian parliamentary election the coalition of Svoboda and the other extreme-right political parties in Ukraine―National Corps, the Governmental Initiative of Yarosh, and the Right Sector―won only 2.15% of the vote combined and failed to pass the 5% threshold. No far-right parties gained seats in the Verkhovna Rada (Ukraine's parliament), as they all failed to win any single-mandate constituency seat.

Background

The far-right in Ukraine is not identical with Ukrainian nationalism which resulted in part from Ukraine being historically divided between various imperial powers. Post-Soviet Ukraine is home to competing nationalisms and cultural orientations. The nationalist organizations during World War II remain controversial. National attitudes about the far-right are impacted by the ambivalent role Ukraine played during Nazi occupation, with Ukrainians volunteering in SS troops and as concentration camp guards.

Far-right violent extremism

Hate crimes were relatively uncommon in Ukraine compared to other Eastern European countries until 2005, but became more common between 2005 and 2008, mostly due to informal youth groups, in particular skinheads. For example, in 2008, Kharkiv Human Rights Protection Group, issued an open letter complaining about the open neo-Nazi activities of one such group, called Patriot of Ukraine, comparing their activities in Kyiv and Kharkiv to what was seen in Russia in 2000–2001. Since 2008, there has been a more explicit response to such crimes by law enforcement and the justice system, which has led to a decrease of vio­lent right-wing offences. Ukraine has seen a decrease in both the frequency and the severity of hate crimes since their high in the mid-2000s. Between 2006 and 2012, there were 295 reported violent hate crimes and 13 hate-crime-related deaths. 2007 was the most violent year in terms of racially motivated crimes with 88 registered assaults with 6 fatalities. By comparison, in Russia during the same year there were a reported 625 casualties with 94 deaths attributed to far-right violence. The significant difference results in part the from the different sizes of the racist youth and skinhead scene in Ukraine and Russia. According to estimates, in 2008 Ukraine had a maximum of 2,000 organized skinheads whereas in Russia the estimates range between 20,000 and 70,000 members of skinhead groups. The last reported death due to a hate crime occurred in 2010.

Regular torchlight marches by members of the Ukrainian far-right have drawn comparisons to those in Germany after World War I and Ukrainian authorities have faced widespread criticism for their perceived inaction in the face of far-right crime. Repeated attempts by authorities to memorialize Ukrainian nationalist leaders who collaborated with Nazi Germany during World War II have also drawn criticism.

In 2017 Human Rights Watch reported that there have been numerous incidents of violence by far-right organisations against LGBT people, Roma people, feminists and civil rights activists. These violent incidents were not prosecuted by the Ukrainian authorities, although the perpetrators even claimed them on social media. Tanya Cooper, Ukraine researcher at Human Rights Watch, stated that: "Members of radical groups that attack and intimidate people to promote hate and discrimination are breaking Ukraine's law and should be held accountable. [...] Ukrainian law enforcement authorities should protect Ukrainians' right to peaceful assembly without fear of obstruction and attacks".

In 2019, a Bellingcat investigation revealed that the Ukrainian government gave over 8 million hryvnias (over $300,000 USD)) for "national-patriotic education projects” targeting Ukrainian youth. A proportion of this (845,000 hryvnias — over $30,000) went to several far-right nationalist groups, including National Corps and possible fronts for C14.

Violence against Jews

A survey by the Pew Research Center in 2018 found that antisemitic sentiments were less prevalent in Ukraine than other Eastern and Central European countries. While 5% of Ukrainians stated that they would not like to have Jews as their fellow citizens, the figure was 14% in Russia and Hungary, 16% in Greece and 32% in Armenia. In contrast, an Anti-Defamation League survey in 2019 showed 46% index score (answering 'probably true' to a majority of the antisemitic stereotypes tested) for Ukraine (up from 32% in 2015), compared to 48% for Poland or 31% for Russia.

Antisemitic rhetoric used by far-right activists relatively rarely translates into violent actions. Between 2004 and 2014, there were 112 anti-Semitic violent attacks, with a decrease over time, in Ukraine. According to statistics on antisemitic vandalism collected by the Association of Jewish Organizations and Communities of Ukraine in the first three months of 2018, extremists tried to disrupt twelve public events and attacked a variety of targets. While direct physical violence was not deployed in all twelve cases, extremist groups sought to restrict the rights and freedoms of Ukraine's citizens.

Support for Nazi collaborators and Ukrainian nationalists

In April 2015, Ukraine passed a series of controversial "decommunization laws" regulating official memory of the Holocaust period. Law no. 2538-1 "On the Legal Status and Honoring of the Memory of the Fighters for the Independence of Ukraine in the 20th Century" elevating several historical organizations, including the Ukrainian Insurgent Army and the Organization of Ukrainian Nationalists, to official status. The laws have been widely criticised as ignoring and whitewashing these organisations.

In the subsequent period, a number of memorials have been dedicated to collaborators. In 2019, the mayor of the Ukrainian city of Ivano-Frankisvsk had a monument built in honour of the Roman Shukhevych, one of the commanders of Nachtigall Battalion, receiving official protest from the state of Israel and Poland. In Ternopil, Stryi and thirteen other localities, busts and memorials were erected dedicated to the Yaroslav Stetsko.

In 2019, during a clash between law enforcement officers and the neo-Nazi group S14 at a campaign event in Kyiv for presidential candidate Yulia Tymoshenko, a Ukrainian riot police officer was caught on video shouting "On the ground, banderist!", which is a derogatory term for a Stepan Bandera supporter. The next day, a social media campaign was organised with the hashtag '#ЯБандерівець' (#IAmABanderist) against the officer, where several public figures claimed to be Bandera supporters as well. These included the head of the National Police Serhiy Knyazev, Interior Ministry and National Police spokesman Artem Shevchenko and Interior Ministry advisor Zoryan Shkyryak.

Pro-Russian separatism 

According to a 2016 report by French Institute of International Relations (IFRI), far-right Russian nationalism, neo-imperialism and Orthodox fundamentalism has shaped the official ideology of the Donetsk and Luhansk People's Republics, the two self-proclaimed states controlled by pro-Russian separatists but internationally recognized as part of Ukraine. During the Russo-Ukrainian War, especially at the beginning, far-right groups played an important role on the pro-Russian side, arguably more so than on the Ukrainian side.

Members and former members of Russian National Unity (RNU), the National Bolshevik Party, the Eurasian Youth Union, and Cossack groups formed branches to recruit volunteers to join the separatists. A former RNU member, Pavel Gubarev, was founder of the Donbas People's Militia and first "governor" of the Donetsk People's Republic. RNU is particularly linked to the Russian Orthodox Army, one of a number of separatist units described as "pro-Tsarist" and "extremist" Orthodox nationalists. Neo-Nazi units such as the 'Rusich', 'Svarozhich' and 'Ratibor' battalions, use Slavic swastikas on their badges. 'Rusich' is part of the Wagner Group, a Russian mercenary group in Ukraine which has been linked to far-right extremism.

Some of the most influential far-right nationalists among the Russian separatists are neo-imperialists, who seek to revive the Russian Empire. These included Igor 'Strelkov' Girkin, first "minister of defence" of the Donetsk People's Republic, who espouses Russian neo-imperialism and ethno-nationalism. The Russian Imperial Movement, a white supremacist militant group, has recruited thousands of volunteers to join the separatists. Some separatists have flown the black-yellow-white Russian imperial flag, such as the Sparta Battalion. In 2014, volunteers from the National Liberation Movement joined the DPR People's Militia bearing portraits of Tsar Nicholas II.

Other Russian volunteers involved in separatist militias included members of the Eurasian Youth Union, and of banned groups such as the Slavic Union and the Movement Against Illegal Immigration. Another Russian separatist paramilitary unit, the Interbrigades, is made up of activists from the National Bolshevik (Nazbol) group Other Russia.

Russian far-right groups gradually became less important in Donbas as the need for Russian radical nationalists faded.

Analysis
According to a 2018 report by the NGO Freedom House far-right groups have been marginal in Ukrainian society and especially in Ukrainian politics. The report identifies three political parties in Ukraine which qualify as extremist ― Svoboda, National Corps and Right Sector. None of the three parties obtained enough votes to gain parliamentary representation. The report argues that due to the far right's weakness in official politics, right-wing groups have sought avenues outside of politics to impose their agenda on Ukrainian society, including attempts to disrupt peaceful assemblies and use force against those with opposite political and cultural views such as left-wing, feminist, LGBT, and human rights activists. The report concludes that while such groups do not have the capabilities to challenge the state, they pose a threat to Ukrainian democracy because they reject democratic values yet actively employ all spectrum of the opportunities offered by democracy. One particular area of concern according to the report is that Ukrainian law enforcement has failed to stop far-right disruptions and such activities have gone unpunished. The report calls on Ukrainian authorities to take more effective measures.

While far-right activists played their role in the first few months of the conflict in 2014, their importance was often exaggerated. The development of the conflict ultimately led declination of far-right groups on both sides of the conflict. The political climate in the separatists-controlled Donetsk and Luhansk further pushed far-right groups into the margins.

American scholar and journalist Stephen F. Cohen wrote in The Nation in 2018 that the resurrection of Nazi ideology could be observed all around the globe, including Europe and the United States, but that the growing Ukrainian Neo-Nazi movement posed a special danger due to its well-armed and well-organized nature in a political center of the Second Cold War. Cohen cited the Azov battalion and Right Sector in this regard. In 2020, Taras Kuzio criticized Cohen, noting research finding they were largely filled by Russian speakers and national minorities. Kuzio says despite Cohen's claims, even Right Sector and Azov Regiment that are often described as 'nationalist', had minorities such included Georgians, Jews, Russians, Tatars, and Armenians.

British scholar Richard Sakwa wrote in 2015 that "The creation of the National Guard, consisting largely of far-right militants and others from the Maidan self-defence forces, had the advantage of removing these militants from the centre of Kyiv and other western Ukrainian towns, but they often lacked discipline and treated south-east Ukraine as occupied territory, regularly committing atrocities against civilians and captured 'terrorists'."

Press coverage 
Despite the fact that far-right parties in Ukraine have been unpopular with the electorate and received considerably less support than far-right parties in other European countries, the Russian government and media started to label Ukraine a "fascist state" following the Orange Revolution in 2004. The subject of the far right's alleged influence in Ukraine became especially politicized during the 2013–2014 Revolution of Dignity when small radical groups without political influence received disproportionate media attention not only in Russia as well as in the West. The impact of these and similar organizations on both Ukrainian politics and society has since been greatly exaggerated in Russian state media and also in some West European journalistic accounts.

Media coverage has been focused largely on Right Sector and on Svoboda whose members stand accused of killing four national guardsmen using hand grenades during a rally outside Ukrainian parliament in August 2015.

Russian president Vladimir Putin used the pretext of "denazification" to launch the invasion of Ukraine in 2022. The US Holocaust Memorial Museum and Yad Vashem condemned Putin's abuse of Holocaust history. In an analysis of the Russian propaganda article "What Russia should do with Ukraine", historian Timothy Snyder pointed out that the use of words "Nazi" and "denazification" by the Russian regime has no direct link to historical use of these words.

Far-right political parties
 Social-National Party of Ukraine (1991–2004)
 Congress of Ukrainian Nationalists (1992–present)
 Svoboda (political party) (2004–present)
 Ukrainian National Union (political party) (2009–present)
 Right Sector (2013–present)
 National Corps (2016–present)

After Yanokovych's ouster in February 2014, the interim First Yatsenyuk government placed four Svoboda members in leading positions: Oleksandr Sych as Vice Prime Minister of Ukraine, Ihor Tenyukh as Minister of Defense, lawyer Ihor Shvaika as Minister of Agrarian Policy and Food and Andriy Mokhnyk as Minister of Ecology and Natural Resources of Ukraine; with the fall of the First Yatsenyuk government on 27 November 2014, Svoboda lost representation in the Ukrainian Government. From 14 April 2016 to 29 August 2019, the Chairman of the Ukrainian Parliament was Andriy Parubiy, the co-founder of the SNPU; however, Parubiy left such organizations in 2004 and later joined moderate political parties, such as Our Ukraine, Batkivshchyna and the People's Front.

In June 2015, Democratic Representative John Conyers and his Republican colleague Ted Yoho offered bipartisan amendments to block the U.S. military training of Ukraine's Azov Battalion—called a "neo-Nazi paramilitary militia" by Conyers and Yoho. Andriy Biletsky, the head of the ultra-nationalist and far right political groups Social-National Assembly and Patriots of Ukraine, has been commander of the Azov Battalion. Azov Battalion of the Ukrainian National Guard is fighting pro-Russian separatists in the War in Donbass. Some members of the battalion are openly white supremacists.

In the 2019 Ukrainian elections, the far-right nationalist electoral alliance, including Svoboda, National Corps, Right Sector, Azov Battalion, OUN, and Congress of Ukrainian Nationalists, under-performed expectations. In the presidential election, its candidate Ruslan Koshulynskyi received 1.6% of the vote, and in the parliamentary election, it was reduced to a single seat and saw its national vote fall to 2.15%, half of its result from 2014 and one-quarter of its result from 2012.

Far-right groups 

 Patriot of Ukraine (2005–2014)
 Social-National Assembly (2008–2015)
 Right Sector (2013–present)
 National Corps (2016–present)
 S14 (2010–present)
 Misanthropic Division (2014–present)

Notes

References
 
 
 
 

 
Independence movements
Nationalist movements in Europe
Nationalism
Nationalism
Far-right
Far-right politics in Europe